Baji (Nepal Bhasa: बजि, chiura, English: flattened rice) is a type of beaten rice eaten in Nepal. The most common word for it, and the one visitors to Nepal will generally encounter, is "chiura." "Baji" is the term used by the Newar culture in the Kathmandu Valley. Rice is a staple in Nepal, as throughout South Asia. The grain is incorporated into everyday life, festivals, and rituals. Chiura is a common snack among farmers and workers in rural Nepal. The snack is made by pounding rice. The dish can be served with yogurt, curry, and or meat. Often chiura is paired with tea as a mid-morning snack in the fields.

Chiura holds an important place in the traditional Nepali wedding ceremony. Chiura is usually included in the brideprice, any valuables or wealth given to the bride’s family by the groom. After the initial wedding ceremony, the families escort the bride back to the groom’s house. During this procession, the pounded rice ceremony occurs. The bride and groom are seated next to one another, and the bride is given the chiura. The groom then formally asks the bride to give him the chiura. He will ask this two more times, each time using a form of “you” that indicates a lowering of her social status. This ceremony reiterates the fact that the woman’s social ranking has dropped far below its original status.

Types 
 Red (Nepal Bhasa:ह्यांगु बजि hyangu baji): using reddish beaten rice.
 White (Nepal Bhasa: तुयु बजि tuyu baji)

Consumption 
It is usually consumed during the daytime with lentil or other vegetables with soup. It is the main food served in Newari feasts. The red type is considered better type. Samaybaji is specially consumed in Newari festivals.

Liquified baji is also used in Chinese folk medicine as an aphrodisiac.

References

Newari cuisine
Rice dishes